NovaCare Rehabilitation is a division of the Select Medical Corporation.  NovaCare Rehabilitation operates as part of Select Medical Corporation's Outpatient Division which includes approximately 1900 locations in 37 states and the District of Columbia and operates primarily as Select Physical Therapy, NovaCare Rehabilitation, Kessler Rehabilitation Center, First Choice Rehabilitation, Saco Bay Physical Therapy and KORT. Select Medical acquired the company in 1999.

References

External links

Physiotherapy organizations
Health care companies based in Pennsylvania
Companies based in Cumberland County, Pennsylvania
Companies with year of establishment missing